Cristian is a commune in Brașov County, Transylvania, Romania. It is composed of a single village, Cristian. 

It is traversed south to north by the Ghimbășel river.

At the 2002 census, 95.3% of inhabitants were Romanians, 2.9% Transylvanian Saxons and 1.8% Hungarians. 93.1% were Romanian Orthodox, 2.6% Lutheran, 1.7% Christian Evangelical, 0.8% Reformed and 0.5% Roman Catholic.

References

Communes in Brașov County
Localities in Transylvania
Burzenland